Manhattan Angel is a 1949 American comedy musical film starring Gloria Jean.

It was originally called Sweetheart of the Blues. It was made after I Surrender Dear.

Plot
Gloria Cole and Eddie Swenson are working to keep an old house, now being used as a youth center, from being razed to make room for a new skyscraper in Manhattan. Gloria enters a friend in a beauty contest with a $25,000 first prize and, after some iffy-maneuvering, her friend wins the contest and the money goes to preserving the youth center.

Cast
 Gloria Jean as Gloria Cole
 Ross Ford as Eddie Swenson
 Patricia Barry as Maggie Graham (as Patricia White)
 Thurston Hall as Everett H. Burton

References

External links

1949 films
1940s musical drama films
American musical drama films
Films about beauty pageants
Columbia Pictures films
American black-and-white films
1949 drama films
Films with screenplays by George H. Plympton
Films directed by Arthur Dreifuss
1940s American films